Hank Earl Carr (January 31, 1968 – May 19, 1998) was a convicted criminal who, on May 19, 1998, shot his girlfriend's four-year-old son with a rifle, was arrested, and then escaped from his handcuffs and killed two Tampa detectives and a Florida state trooper. Carr then barricaded himself in a convenience store and held a clerk hostage before committing suicide with a self-inflicted gunshot wound to the head.

The murders of the law-enforcement personnel prompted national controversy on the proper way to handcuff a suspected criminal, and local media were widely criticized for inhibiting police work while Carr was trapped in the convenience store.

Killings and death 
On the morning of May 19, around 10:30 a.m., Carr carried the young son of his girlfriend Bernice Bowen into a fire station. The boy had a gunshot wound to the head, but the circumstances of the injury were unclear — first Carr claimed that the boy was dragging a rifle and walking around when it accidentally discharged, but later he said that he himself had been holding it when it discharged.

Carr, having told police he was Joseph Bennett, the father of the child, ran back to the site of the shooting while being pursued by police. Threatening an officer with a rifle, he dropped it and again ran away, and this time was caught and handcuffed. Tampa Police Department detectives Randy Bell and Ricky Childers took him back to the apartment where the boy had been shot to continue to interview him. On the trip back to the police department, with Bell and Childers in the front seats and Carr sitting behind them, handcuffed in front, Carr successfully unlocked his handcuffs with a key he carried on his person, he then disarmed Childers by snatching his Glock handgun from his shoulder holster. In the struggle that ensued, Carr shot both officers in the face, killing them at the scene.

Exiting the car, he carjacked a pickup truck and fled. After briefly visiting his mother and refueling at a local service station, he got on Interstate 75 heading north. The first police officer in pursuit was Florida State Trooper James Crooks, and as he approached, Carr veered onto an exit ramp located in Pasco County, Florida, braked, and exited the truck. As Crooks also braked to a stop, Carr approached and shot him twice in the head, killing him instantly.

Getting back in the pickup truck, Carr fled as multiple police cars and a police helicopter pursued him in a high-speed chase and gunfight. With his tires blown out and running low on ammunition, Carr exited the interstate and entered a convenience store, where he took as a hostage Stephanie Kramer, a pregnant clerk. For the rest of the afternoon, he remained in the store, as nearly 200 officers surrounded him. Local radio station WFLA conducted phone interviews in the midst of the crisis, later drawing criticism from both journalism experts and police. At 7:20 p.m., Carr released Kramer and shot and killed himself as the SWAT team forcibly entered the building.

Aftermath 
Bowen's son ultimately died, raising the number killed by Carr to four. In later testimony it was revealed that he abused Bowen and her children, and he was found to be a convicted felon with a history of violent crime, including assault of police officers. He was also wanted in several states.

In 1999, Bowen was convicted of child neglect for allowing Carr around her children. Prosecutors contended that since Bowen knew of Carr's violent history, she should have never allowed him to be around children. She was sentenced to 15 years in prison. Later in 1999, she was charged with aiding and abetting Carr's escape, as well as for being an accessory to the murders of her son and the three police officers. Even after one officer broke down and begged her to tell them Carr's real name, Bowen didn't do so. Prosecutors claimed that if she had, police would have known he was a wanted man and convicted felon.

She was sentenced to 21.5 years in prison, to run concurrently with her child neglect sentence. However, those convictions were thrown out on appeal in 2001. A state appeals court found that prosecutors focused too much on what Bowen should have done to prevent Carr's rampage, rather than what she did after the crimes were committed. The court also acquitted her of aiding and abetting the deaths of her son and Trooper Crooks. She was convicted of the remaining charges in 2002, and sentenced to 20 years in prison. Sentencing guidelines called for only 6–11 years, but in sentencing her, the judge said that Bowen's lies to police were so egregious that they endangered the public. This sentence also runs concurrently with her child abuse sentence, and she was released in October 2016.

Experts later expressed shock that the detectives had not handcuffed Carr's hands behind his back, but others defended the action, arguing that at the time the detectives thought they were dealing with a bereaved father, not a violent criminal. The media's handling of the situation also received sharp criticism, as in addition to the radio station's live interview, camera crews for local television stations were broadcasting live shots of the area surrounding the convenience store.

In popular culture
Carr's case has been featured in multiple television series such as World's Wildest Police Videos in 1998 and Investigation Discovery's Hostage: Do or Die in 2011.

References

External links 
 10 years of reckoning | Tampabay.com - Video interviews and compilation of news
 
 
 
 One Dead Baby, Three Dead Police Officers, One Killer Boyfriend and The Girlfriend Who Could've Prevented It, True Murders
 Tragic, violent day from Tampa Tribune (with video)

1968 births
1998 suicides
American escapees
American murderers of children
American spree killers
Hostage taking in the United States
Murder–suicides in Florida
Suicides by firearm in Florida